Shin Yea-ji (born April 8, 1984 in Seoul) is a South Korean former competitive figure skater. She is the 1999 South Korean national champion and 2002 national silver medalist. She competed in the free skate at three ISU Championships.

Programs

Competitive highlights
JGP: ISU Junior Grand Prix

References

External links
 

South Korean female single skaters
1984 births
Living people
Figure skaters from Seoul
Figure skaters at the 1999 Asian Winter Games
Figure skaters at the 2003 Asian Winter Games